The 2005 World Wushu Championships was the 8th edition of the World Wushu Championships. It was held at the Quan Ngua Sports Palace in Hanoi, Vietnam from December 9 to December 14, 2005. 525 athletes from 67 IWUF national federations participated in this event.

Medal summary

Medal table

Men's taolu

Men's sanda

Women's taolu

Women's sanda

Results 



World Wushu Championships
Wushu Championships
World Wushu Championships, 2005
2005 in wushu (sport)
Wushu in Vietnam